Mulatu Astatke (French pronunciation: Astatqé; born 19 December 1943) is an Ethiopian musician and arranger considered as the father of "Ethio-jazz".

Born in Jimma, Mulatu was musically trained in London, New York City, and Boston where he combined his jazz and Latin music interests with traditional Ethiopian music. Mulatu led his band while playing vibraphone and conga drums—instruments that he introduced into Ethiopian popular music—as well as other percussion instruments, keyboards, and organs. His albums focus primarily on instrumental music, and Mulatu appears on all three known albums of instrumentals that were released during the Ethiopian Golden Age in 1970s.

Biography

Early life

Mulatu Astatke is of Christian Amhara descent. Mulatu's family sent the young Mulatu to learn engineering in Wales during the late 1950s. Instead, he began his education at Lindisfarne College near Wrexham before earning a degree in music through studies at the Trinity College of Music in London. He collaborated with jazz vocalist and percussionist Frank Holder. In the 1960s, Mulatu moved to the United States to enroll at Berklee College of Music in Boston. He studied vibraphone and percussion.

While living in the U.S., Mulatu became interested in Latin jazz and recorded his first two albums, Afro-Latin Soul, Volumes 1 & 2, in New York City in 1966. The records prominently feature Mulatu's vibraphone, backed by piano and congas playing Latin rhythms, and were entirely instrumental with the exception of the song "I Faram Gami I Faram," which was sung in Spanish.

In the early 1970s, Mulatu brought his new sound, which he called Ethio-jazz, back to his homeland while continuing to work in the U.S. He collaborated with many notable artists in both countries, arranging and playing on recordings by Mahmoud Ahmed, and appearing as a special guest with Duke Ellington and his band during a tour of Ethiopia in 1973.

Mulatu recorded Mulatu of Ethiopia (1972) in New York City, but most of his music was released by Amha Eshete's label Amha Records in Addis Ababa, Ethiopia, including several singles, his album Yekatit Ethio Jazz (1974), and six out of the ten tracks on the compilation album Ethiopian Modern Instrumentals Hits. Yekatit Ethio Jazz combined traditional Ethiopian music with American jazz, funk, and soul.

By 1975, Amha Records had ceased production after the Derg military junta forced the label's owner to flee the country. Mulatu remained to play vibes for Hailu Mergia and the Walias Band's 1977 album Tche Belew (which included "Musicawi Silt") before the Walias also left Ethiopia to tour internationally. By the 1980s, Mulatu's music was largely forgotten outside of his homeland.

Recent works

In the early 1990s, many record collectors rediscovered the music of Mulatu Astatke and were combing stashes of vinyl for copies of his '70s releases. In 1998, the Parisian record label Buda Musique began to reissue many of the Amha-era Ethio-jazz recordings on compact disc as part of the series Éthiopiques, and the first of these reissues to be dedicated to a single musician was Éthiopiques Volume 4: Ethio Jazz & Musique Instrumentale, 1969–1974. The album brought Mulatu's music to an international audience.

Mulatu's music has had an influence on other musicians from the Horn region, such as K'naan. His Western audience increased when the film Broken Flowers (2005) directed by Jim Jarmusch featured seven of his songs, including one performed by Cambodian-American rock band Dengue Fever. National Public Radio used his instrumentals as beds under or between pieces, notably on the program This American Life. Samples of his were used by Nas, Damian Marley, Kanye West, Cut Chemist, Quantic, Madlib, and Oddisee.

After meeting the Massachusetts-based Either/Orchestra in Addis Ababa in 2004, Mulatu began a collaboration with the band beginning with performances in Scandinavia in summer 2006 and London, New York, Germany, Holland, Glastonbury (UK), Dublin, and Toronto in 2008. In the fall of 2008, he collaborated with the London-based collective The Heliocentrics on the album Inspiration Information Vol. 3, which included re-workings of his Ethio-jazz classics with new material by the Heliocentrics and himself.

In 2008, he completed a Radcliffe Institute Fellowship at Harvard University, where he worked on modernization of traditional Ethiopian instruments and premiered a portion of a new opera, The Yared Opera. He served as an Abramowitz Artist-in-Residence at the Massachusetts Institute of Technology, giving lectures and workshops and advising MIT Media Lab on creating a modern version of the krar, a traditional Ethiopian instrument.

On 1 February 2009, Mulatu performed at the Luckman Auditorium in Los Angeles with a band that included Bennie Maupin, Azar Lawrence, and Phil Ranelin. He released a two-disc compilation album to be sold exclusively to passengers of Ethiopian Airlines, with the first disc containing a compilation of styles from different regions of Ethiopia and the second consisting of studio originals. On 12 May 2012, he received an honorary doctorate of music from the Berklee College of Music.

In 2015, Mulatu began recording with Black Jesus Experience for Cradle of Humanity, which premiered at the Melbourne Jazz Festival in 2016 and was followed by a tour of Australia and New Zealand.

Discography

As bandleader
 Maskaram Setaba, 7" (Addis Ababa, 1966)
 Afro-Latin Soul, Volume  (Worthy, 1966)
 Afro-Latin Soul, Volume 2 (Worthy, 1966)
 Mulatu of Ethiopia (Worthy, 1972)
 Yekatit Ethio-Jazz (Amha, 1974)
 Plays Ethio Jazz (Poljazz, 1989)
 Mulatu Astatke
 Assiyo Bellema
 Éthiopiques, Vol. 4: Ethio Jazz & Musique Instrumentale, 1969–1974 (Buda Musique, 1998)
 Mulatu Steps Ahead with the Either/Orchestra (Strut, 2010)
 Sketches of Ethiopia (Jazz Village, 2013)

As a musician and collaborator
Tche Belew with Hailu Mergia & The Walias Band (Kaifa, 1977)
Inspiration Information with The Heliocentrics (2009)
Cradle of Humanity with Black Jesus Experience (2016)
To Know Without Knowing with Black Jesus Experience (2020)

Compilation appearances
 Ethiopian Modern Instrumentals Hits (Amha, 1974)
 New York–Addis–London: The Story of Ethio Jazz 1965–1975
 The Rough Guide to the Music of Ethiopia (World Music Network, 2004)
 Broken Flowers (Decca, 2005)

References

External links
 Mulatu Astatke Steps Ahead album site
 Mulatu Astatke: Ethio Jazz
 Berklee Spotlight: Echoes in Africa
 Either Orchestra performances with Mulatu Astatke
 A second round of glory article at Ha'aretz.
 Mulatu Astatke RBMA lecture

1943 births
Berklee College of Music alumni
Ethiopian composers
Ethiopian emigrants to the United States
Ethiopian music arrangers
Living people
People educated at Lindisfarne College
People from Oromia Region
Radcliffe fellows
Jazz vibraphonists